Artediellina is a monospecific genus of marine ray-finned fish belonging to the family Cottidae, the typical sculpins.

References

Cottinae
Monotypic fish genera
Fish described in 1937